The 1978 Wyoming Cowboys football team was an American football team that represented the University of Wyoming as a member of the Western Athletic Conference (WAC) during the 1978 NCAA Division I-A football season.  In their second season under head coach Bill Lewis, the Cowboys compiled a 5–7 record (4–2 against conference opponents), finished in third place out of seven teams in the WAC, and outscored opponents by a total of 253 to 245. They played their home games at War Memorial Stadium in Laramie, Wyoming.

Schedule

References

Wyoming
Wyoming Cowboys football seasons
Wyoming Cowboys football